Baeolidia dela is a species of sea slug, an aeolid nudibranch. It is a marine gastropod mollusc in the family Aeolidiidae.

Distribution
This species was described from Addu Atoll, Maldives.

Description
Baeolidia dela is known only from its internal and external anatomy as it was described from a preserved specimen. The colouration of this species is unknown. The shape of the cerata is described as cylindrical and this could be the distinctive feature that may help to identify this species if Baeolidia specimens matching this description are seen in the Maldives.

References

Aeolidiidae
Gastropods described in 1977